Sheebah Zalwango (born 20 August 2000) is a Ugandan footballer who plays as a midielder for FUFA Women Super League club Asubo Gafford Ladies and the Uganda women's national team.

Club career 
Nabbosa has played for Asubo Gafford Ladies in Uganda.

International career 
Nabbosa capped for Uganda at senior level during the 2021 COSAFA Women's Championship.

References 

2000 births
Living people
Ugandan women's footballers
Women's association football midfielders
Uganda women's international footballers
21st-century Ugandan women